Estrada de Ferro Dona Teresa Cristina is an old railway in Santa Catarina, Southern Brazilian state.

See also
 RFFSA

References

Railway lines in Brazil